Albert Graf (born 17 April 1955) is an Austrian luger. He competed in the men's singles event at the 1980 Winter Olympics.

References

External links
 

1955 births
Living people
Austrian male lugers
Olympic lugers of Austria
Lugers at the 1980 Winter Olympics